Johnson-Jolls Complex, also known as the Dr. Willard B. Jolls House, is a historic home located at Orchard Park in Erie County, New York.  It is an Italianate style brick house built in 1869.  The house was built originally for merchant Ambrose Johnson; in 1902 it was purchased by Dr. Willard B. Jolls who resided there until his death in 1963.

It was listed on the National Register of Historic Places in 1980.

References

External links
Johnson-Jolls Complex on Main St. - Orchard Park, NY - Victorian Houses on Waymarking.com

Houses on the National Register of Historic Places in New York (state)
Italianate architecture in New York (state)
Houses completed in 1869
Houses in Erie County, New York
1869 establishments in New York (state)
National Register of Historic Places in Erie County, New York